Bob Hickey (born May 11, 1952) is an American bobsledder. He competed in the four man event at the 1980 Winter Olympics.

References

1952 births
Living people
American male bobsledders
Olympic bobsledders of the United States
Bobsledders at the 1980 Winter Olympics
People from Keene, New York